Gariwangsan is a mountain between the counties of Jeongseon and Pyeongchang, Gangwon-do, in South Korea.

A skiing area hosted skiing events for the 2018 Winter Olympics in Pyeongchang County.

See also
 List of mountains in Korea

Notes

References
 

Mountains of South Korea
Pyeongchang County
Jeongseon County
Mountains of Gangwon Province, South Korea
One-thousanders of South Korea